The Primera División de Fútbol Profesional Apertura 2005 season (officially "Torneo Apertura 2004") started on August 13, 2005.

The season was composed of the following clubs:

 C.D. FAS
 C.D. Vista Hermosa
 San Salvador F.C.
 C.D. Águila
 C.D. Luis Ángel Firpo
 A.D. Isidro Metapán
 C.D. Atlético Balboa
 Alianza F.C.
 C.D. Chalatenango
 Once Municipal

Team information

Personnel and sponsoring

Managerial changes

Before the season

During the season

Apertura 2005 standings
Last updated August 25, 2007

Top scorers

Semifinals 1st Leg

Semifinals 2nd Leg

Final

List of foreign players in the league
This is a list of foreign players in Apertura 2005. The following players:
have played at least one apetura game for the respective club.
have not been capped for the El Salvador national football team on any level, independently from the birthplace

C.D. Águila
  Jorge Wagner 
  Alejandro Sequeira
  Fabio Ulloa
  James López

Alianza F.C.
  Gonzalo Gravano
  Juan Zandoná
  Didier Ovono
  Arturo Albarrán

Atletico Balboa
  Ernesto Noel Aquino
  Franklin Webster
  Nestor Ayala
  Juan Carlos Mosquera

Chalatenango
  Víctor Jaramillo 
  José Luis López
  Ariel Leonel González  
  Gabriel Garcete
  Centeno Renau
  Cesar Charun

C.D. FAS
  Alexander Obregón
  Nicolás Muñoz
  Victor Hugo Mafla
  Marcelo Messias  
  Julio Cesar Coleman
  Bernal Mullins Campbell  

 (player released mid season)
  (player Injured mid season)
 Injury replacement player

C.D. Luis Ángel Firpo
  Juan Carlos Reyes
  Mauro Caju 
  Oscar Mejia

A.D. Isidro Metapán
  Paolo Suarez
  Alcides Bandera
  Williams Reyes
  Juan Bicca

Once Municipal
  James Owusu
  Anel Canales
  Libardo Barbajal
  Juan Pablo Chacon

San Salvador F.C.
  Paulo Cesar Rodriguez
   Fábio Pereira de Azevedo
  Hermes Martínez Misal
  Rodrigo Lagos

Vista Hermosa
  Patricio Barroche
  Elder Figueroa
  Luis Torres Rodriguez 
  Cristian Gil Mosquera

External links
 

Primera División de Fútbol Profesional Apertura seasons
El
1